The 2017 Girls' Youth European Volleyball Championship was the 12th edition of the tournament which was held in Arnhem, Netherlands from 1 to 9 April 2017. The top six teams qualified for the 2017 Youth World Championship.

Participating teams

Pools composition

Preliminary round

All times are Central European Summer Time (UTC+02:00).

Pool I

|}

|}

Pool II

|}

|}

Final round
All times are Central European Summer Time (UTC+02:00).

5th–8th place

5th–8th semifinals

|}

7th place match

|}

5th place match

|}

Final

Semifinals

|}

3rd place match

|}

Final

|}

Final standing

Awards
At the conclusion of the tournament, the following players were selected as the tournament dream team.

Most Valuable Player
 
Best Setter
 
Best Outside Spikers
 
 

Best Middle Blockers
 
 
Best Opposite Spiker
 
Best Libero

References

External links
Official website

Girls' Youth European Volleyball Championship
Girls
Volleyball
International volleyball competitions hosted by the Netherlands
April 2017 sports events in Europe
2017 in Dutch women's sport